Colin Franken (born May 16, 1993), known professionally as Frankie Bash, is an American record producer, songwriter, rapper, and singer. Bash has worked with artists such as Future, Juice Wrld, NAV, Gunna, YoungBoy Never Broke Again, Gucci Mane, Offset, Nimic Revenue, Bobby Raps and Wheezy.

Discography

2017
Timelapse

2018
Spaceboy Level 1: Circa 2015 
Bettiana EP with R.A.D

Production credits

2018

Nimic Revenue
00. "Decline"

Lil Durk – Only The Family Involved Vol. 1
06. "Happy Gilmore" (featuring Nimic Revenue)

Bobby Raps – WeirdLilWorld
15. "Cause I'm Sad..."

Future and Juice Wrld – Wrld on Drugs
10. "Realer n Realer"

2019

Future – The Wizrd
12. "Krazy But True"

Nimic Revenue
00. Awlorn Gang

Nimic Revenue – Undisputed
12. Therapy

Nimic Revenue – Lifeline (EP)
1. Tattoo
2. Kim K
3. Paramount
4. Yeah Featuring DaniLeigh
5. Kawasaki 
6. Way We Chill
7. Lifeline (produced with drodro)
8. Almost Made It
9. Wedding Cake
10. 38
11. Butterfly
12. Greenroom featuring Chief Keef

Offset featuring Young Thug – Control the Streets, Vol. 2
15. Big Rocks

R.A.D Featuring Corbin – Dykon
13. Bone Yard

2020

Lil Gotit
01. So Slime

Nimic Revenue 
01. P.O.M.E. featuring Calboy

Nimic Revenue 
01. Win Again

Gunna – Wunna
01. ARGENTINA

Gucci Mane – So Icy Summer
02. Rain Shower featuring Young Thug

NAV – Emergency Tsunami
04. Nasty 
06. Vetement Socks 
10. Do Ya Deed featuring Sahbabii

YoungBoy Never Broke Again – Until I Return
04. Toxic

2021

Baby Keem & Kendrick Lamar
01. Family Ties

Lil Gotit – Top Chef Gotit
11. Waptopia

Yung Gravy – Gravy Train Down Memory Lane: Side A
01. Skiing in Japan Freestyle

Kevin Gates – Only the Generals, Pt. II
01. Send That Load

Money Man – Blockchain
04. Numerology

Bobby Fishscale – The Evolution
06. Sellin Dat Shit

Corbin – Ghost With Skin
15. Reaper

D Smoke – War & Wonders
11. Say Go

SSGKobe – KO.
06. Capsules

2022

Yeat – 2 Alive
01. Kant Die

Lil Gotit – The Cheater
03. Now We Getting Money Featuring Lil Keed & Lil PJ 
18. Thoughts About My Ex

Jack Harlow – Come Home the Kids Miss You
09. I Got a Shot

References

1993 births
Rappers from Minnesota
Living people
21st-century American rappers
Singer-songwriters from Minnesota